Ethan Daniel Davidson (born October 21, 1969) is an American musician and philanthropist known for producing folk music. Since the late 1990s, Davidson has released ten studio albums.

Early life and education 
He is the son of billionaire William "Bill" Davidson, former owner of the Detroit Pistons and Guardian Industries, which was purchased by Koch Industries in 2017. He has one sister, Marla Karimipour, and three stepsisters, including actress Elizabeth Reaser. He was raised in Bloomfield, Michigan and attended Lahser High School. While attending Lahser High School, he was involved in a school band, which he credited with sparking an early interest in music for him.

Davidson graduated from the University of Michigan with a Bachelor of Arts in English. He also studied at Harvard University, the University of Chicago, and the Jewish Theological Seminary. After graduating, he traveled as a bass player in various East Coast bands, and later moved to Alaska.

Music career

Early career 
Davidson first began writing music in the 1990s while living in Wiseman, Alaska. While living in Alaska, he toured the United States on his Six Year Tour during which he played over 900 shows. His first six albums were produced by Al Sutton on his former record label, Times Beach Records, and recorded in Royal Oak, Michigan.

2012–present 
Davidson's wife Gretchen Gonzales Davidson and Warren Defever of His Name Is Alive produced four of Davidson's records, including Silvertooth (2012) and Drawnigh (2015). Davidson and Gretchen founded the band Seedsmen of the World together. Davidson's 2017 album Crows was produced by Blue Arrow Records of Cleveland, Ohio.

Davidson and his wife co-produced the documentary Call Me Bill: The William Davidson Story, which headlined the 2019 Lenore Marwil Detroit Jewish Film Festival. The 90-minute film follows the life of William Davidson and highlights his business philosophies. Davidson also produced the soundtrack for the documentary, which was directed by Deb Agolli and Push Media.

On August 18, it was announced that Davidson was releasing another album, titled Come Down Lonesome, produced with his wife and Defever. The album was released on August 21, 2020 and included both original songs and covers.

Davidson's song "Till the Light Comes Shining In" was featured in Season One, Episode 7 of the Spectrum Original television show Joe Pickett.

Books 

 Davidson, Ethan Daniel (2021). These Are the Developments of the Human. El Studio 444. ISBN 978-0578830100

Style and influences 
Davidson's style has been described as folk, folk rock, and American folk, with influences from artists such as Reverend Gary Davis, Bob Dylan, and Mississippi John Hurt. Mike McGonigal of the Metro Times compared his ability to combine various musical genres to Calexico. His early music often featured heavily political themes, while his later albums focus more on existential conflicts.

Personal life 
Davidson is married to Gretchen Gonzales Davidson, a musician best known for her participation in the band Slumber Party, which released three records on the label Kill Rock Stars. Together, the couple have three children.

Philanthropy 
Davidson was named as the board chair for the Michigan Opera Theatre, succeeding Rick Williams, who stepped down in 2019. Davidson also serves as a board member at Motown Museum and the Detroit Institute of Arts.

Davidson is Treasurer and Chairman of the Grants Committee for The William Davidson Foundation, which was founded by his father.

Discography

Filmography

References 

1969 births
People from Lansing, Michigan
American folk musicians
Living people
University of Michigan alumni